Dominican Republic national field hockey team may refer to:
 Dominican Republic men's national field hockey team
 Dominican Republic women's national field hockey team